Galečić  is a village in the municipality of Tomislavgrad in Canton 10, the Federation of Bosnia and Herzegovina, Bosnia and Herzegovina. The village is located on the hill in the upper part of Šujica Valley.

In close proximity of the village is an old Ottoman bridge over the Šuica river, Galečka Ćuprija, situated in the heart of the Šuica Valley.

Demographics 

According to the 2013 census, its population was 279, all Croats.

Footnotes

Bibliography 

 

Populated places in Tomislavgrad